In telecommunication, a periscope antenna is an antenna configuration in which the transmitting antenna is oriented to produce a vertical radiation pattern, and a flat or off-axis parabolic reflector, mounted above the transmitting antenna, is used to direct the beam in a horizontal path toward the receiving antenna.  

A periscope antenna facilitates increased terrain clearance without long transmission lines, while permitting the active equipment to be located at or near ground level for ease of maintenance.

Sources

Radio frequency antenna types
Antennas (radio)